Ümit Aydın Davala (born 30 July 1973) is a Turkish football coach and former player. During his stint at Galatasaray, he won four Süper Lig, three Turkish Cup, one UEFA Cup and one UEFA Super Cup title between 1996 and 2001. He won the 2003–04 Bundesliga with Werder Bremen. Davala represented Turkey with 41 caps in international competitions, scoring 4 goals. He was  part of the Turkey squad which earned a bronze medal at FIFA World Cup 2002.

Club career
Davala played with VfR Mannheim, ASV Feudenheim, Türkspor Mannheim, Afyonspor, Diyarbakırspor and İstanbulspor before joining Galatasaray in 1997. He won three successive Turkish championships. In 2000, he helped the club to win the Turkish Cup by scoring two goals in the final against Beşiktaş. In the same year, he helped the club win the 2000 UEFA Cup final against Arsenal and the 2000 UEFA Super Cup against Real Madrid.

In September 2001, Davala transferred to Milan in a  He made the transfer because he wanted to follow his former coach at Galatasaray, Fatih Terim, who had been named head coach of Milan. However, in November, Terim was fired and replaced by Carlo Ancelotti, after which Davala lost his first-team place.

In June 2002, Davala was sold to Inter Milan in exchange for Dario Šimić, but was immediately loaned to Galatasaray. In July 2003, Davala was loaned to Werder Bremen, helping the club win the Bundesliga and DFB-Pokal double. In July 2004, he was signed permanently by Bremen, but injuries limited his appearances. A hip injury suffered in October 2005 proved too difficult, and over the winter break of the 2005–06 season, Davala was released by the club. He subsequently retired from professional football.

International career
Davala was part of the Turkey squads for UEFA Euro 2000 and the 2002 FIFA World Cup. In the latter, he stood out for his mohawk hair style and scored a goal against PR China in the group stage, adding the winner against Japan in the second round. He also provided the cross that resulted on İlhan Mansız's golden goal against Senegal in the quarter-finals. Turkey would finish the tournament in third place.

Futsal career
Following retirement from professional football, Davala played futsal in international level. He was called up on Turkey national futsal team by head coach Ömer Kaner, in order to qualify to 2010 UEFA Futsal Championship. In an interview held in 2020, Ömer Kaner stated that Davala found hard to accommodate in futsal, at that time.

Coaching career
Davala had been the head coach of Turkey national under-21 team until June 2008. He then joined Galatasaray S.K. as an assistant manager on 11 June 2008. After a loss to Bursaspor, the Galatasaray board stated "radical changes" were on the way, and, true to its word, the board declared that assistant coaches Davala and Edwin Boekamp were sacked on 10 October 2008 after a brief chat with club president Adnan Polat. However, Davala rejoined Galatasaray as an assistant manager again in June 2011.

Musical career
Davala released several rap themed songs, just after he retired from football. One was a collaboration with Kayahan.

Career statistics

Club

International

Scores and results list Turkey's goal tally first, score column indicates score after each Davala goal.

Honours
Turkey
FIFA World Cup third place: 2002

Galatasaray
 Süper Lig: 1996–97, 1997–98, 1998–99, 1999–2000
 Turkish Cup: 1995–96, 1998–99, 1999–2000
 UEFA Cup: 1999–2000
 UEFA Super Cup: 2000

Werder Bremen
 Bundesliga: 2003–04
 DFB-Pokal: 2003–04

References
Notes

Citations

External links

 Ümit Davala at TFF.org
 
 

Living people
1973 births
Footballers from Mannheim
Association football midfielders
Turkish footballers
Turkey international footballers
Turkish expatriate footballers
Turkish men's futsal players
Turkish football managers
German footballers
German people of Turkish descent
UEFA Euro 2000 players
2002 FIFA World Cup players
Süper Lig players
Serie A players
Bundesliga players
Afyonkarahisarspor footballers
İstanbulspor footballers
Diyarbakırspor footballers
Galatasaray S.K. footballers
A.C. Milan players
Inter Milan players
SV Werder Bremen players
Expatriate footballers in Italy
Turkish expatriate sportspeople in Italy
VfR Mannheim players
Galatasaray S.K. (football) managers
UEFA Cup winning players
Galatasaray S.K. (football) non-playing staff